Olympique de Marseille returned to the UEFA Champions League for the first time in four years, and in spite of going out in the group stage, the side made headlines in the UEFA Cup, knocking Liverpool, Internazionale and Newcastle United out on the way to the final, where the sending off of goalkeeper Fabien Barthez and the converted penalty kick from Valencia's Vicente saw Valencia eventually edge the game.

In the domestic campaign, Marseille endured a disappointing campaign, where manager Alain Perrin was replaced by José Anigo early on, following the inability to hang onto the top teams. The end result was seventh, missing out even on UEFA Cup qualification, in spite of having the French player of the season in Didier Drogba in the team. The Ivorian striker netted 19 league goals and was instrumental to OM's fortunes in Europe, and following the season he was sold to Chelsea.

Squad

Left club during season

Competitions

Ligue 1

League table

Results summary

Results by round

Matches

Champions League

Qualifying

Group stage

UEFA Cup

Last 32

Last 16

Quarter-final

Semi-final

Final

References

- RSSSF France 2003/04

Olympique de Marseille seasons
Marseille